The lateral nasal click is a click consonant found primarily among the languages of southern Africa.

Features

Features of the lateral nasal click:

Occurrence
Lateral nasal clicks are found primarily in the various Khoisan language families of southern Africa and in some neighboring Bantu languages.

Glottalized lateral nasal click

All Khoisan languages, and a few Bantu languages, have glottalized nasal clicks. These are formed by closing the glottis so that the click is pronounced in silence; however, any preceding vowel will be nasalized.

References

Nasal consonants
Click consonants
Lateral consonants
Voiced consonants